Slavcho Petrov Shokolarov (born 20 August 1989) is a Bulgarian professional footballer who plays as a midfielder for Pirin Blagoevgrad.

Career
Shokolarov began his career with Pirin Gotse Delchev before moving to Svetkavitsa in 2008.

After four and a half seasons in Svetkavitsa, his contract was terminated by mutual consent in December 2012 and Shokolarov joined Montana, signing a one-and-a-half-year deal.

Ludogorets Razgrad
In the summer of 2016, Shokolarov signed with Ludogorets Razgrad II since the team wanted an experienced players in Second League. On 20 August 2016, because Georgi Dermendzhiev decided to give a rest to some of the players before the upcoming Champions League play-off match, he made his debut for the first team of Ludogorets and scored a goal.  He left the club on 6 June 2017.

Slavia Sofia
On 23 June 2017, Shokolarov signed with Slavia Sofia.

CSKA 1948
He was part of the CSKA 1948 team between January and late April 2020, appearing in two official games.

Career statistics
As of 27 May 2015

Honours
Ludogorets Razgrad
 Bulgarian First League (1): 2016–17

Slavia Sofia
 Bulgarian Cup (1): 2017–18

References

External links

Living people
1989 births
People from Gotse Delchev
Bulgarian footballers
Association football midfielders
PFC Pirin Gotse Delchev players
PFC Svetkavitsa players
FC Montana players
FC Lyubimets players
PFC Chernomorets Burgas players
PFC Slavia Sofia players
FC Pomorie players
PFC Ludogorets Razgrad II players
PFC Ludogorets Razgrad players
FC CSKA 1948 Sofia players
Botev Plovdiv players
First Professional Football League (Bulgaria) players
Sportspeople from Blagoevgrad Province
Asteras Vlachioti F.C. players